Mulloy is an unincorporated community in Washington County, Oregon, United States, with a population of 59 in 1920.

References

Unincorporated communities in Washington County, Oregon
Unincorporated communities in Oregon